Lesotho is a predominantly Christian country, with Islam being a minority religion. Due to secular nature of the Lesotho's constitution, Muslims are free to proselytize and build places of worship in the country. The Muslim population of Lesotho in 2013 is about 3000 plus throughout the country. Most of the population are from South Asia (India, Pakistan, Bangladesh, and Sri Lanka). South Asian Muslims, being a more prominent and established community, settled in the country to conduct business and trade. Their presence has been well noted since the early 1900s, when a few families migrated from Durban, Kwazulu-Natal. There are various mosques and prayer halls in Lesotho at the Capital City Maseru to Butha-Buthe and other places around geography of Lesotho. Jamaat Khana at Jackpot Market, Bus Stop Jamaat Khana, Pioneer Mall Jamaat Khan, Sekamaneng Islamic Centre Jamaat Khana, Osaman Masjid at Ha-Hoohlo Jamaat Khana and Thabong are the places where people offer their Friday Prayer in Maseru City. The vast majority of Muslims are Sunni. The Ahmadiyya Muslim community claims 350 members in the country and the Shi'ites Muslim are there around 1500 .

References

Lesotho
Religion in Lesotho